|}

The Prix Cambacérès is a Group 1 hurdle race in France which is open to three-year-old horses. It is run at Auteuil over a distance of 3,600 metres (about 2 miles and 2 furlongs), and it is scheduled to take place each year in November.

Winners

References
France Galop / Racing Post:

See also
 List of French jump horse races

Horse races in France